Cissura unilineata is a moth of the subfamily Arctiinae first described by Paul Dognin in 1891. It is found in Ecuador and Peru.

References

Phaegopterina